Blagojev Kamen is a village in the municipality of Kučevo, Serbia. According to the 2002 census, the village has a population of 38 people.

References

Populated places in Braničevo District